The Women's Marathon at the 1992 Summer Olympics in Barcelona, Spain was held on Saturday August 1, 1992. The race started on 6.30 p.m. local time. A total number of 37 athletes completed the race, with Bakombo Kungu from Zaire finishing in last position in 3:29:10. There were 47 competitors from 31 countries. Nine of them did not finish.

After finishing fourth, Madina Biktagirova of the Unified Team tested positive for norephedrine and became the first Olympic marathoner disqualified for failing a drug test.

Medalists

Abbreviations
All times shown are in hours:minutes:seconds

Records

Final ranking

See also
 1990 Women's European Championships Marathon (Split)
 1991 Women's World Championships Marathon (Tokyo)
 1992 Marathon Year Ranking
 1993 Women's World Championships Marathon (Stuttgart)
 1994 Women's European Championships Marathon (Helsinki)

References
Specific

General
  Marathon Info

M
Marathons at the Olympics
1992 marathons
1988 Summer Olympics
Summer Olympics marathon
Women's events at the 1992 Summer Olympics